Abdol Hossein Sardari (1914–1981) was an Iranian diplomat. He is credited with saving thousands of Jews in Europe, He has since been known as “The Iranian Schindler” or "The Schindler of Iran".

Early life and family 
Sardari was born in 1914 in Tehran in a well-to-do aristocratic family. His mother, known as Afsar-Saltaneh, was a niece of Shah Naser al-Din Shah Qajar (1848–1896). His father was Soleyman Adib-ol-Soltaneh. His parents had four sons and three daughters, with Sardari himself being the second youngest son. When he was eight years old, he was sent to a boarding school in England. Sardari then moved to Switzerland where he studied law at University of Geneva, graduating with a law degree in 1936. During his time in Switzerland, he entered the Iranian Foreign Service in that country. 

Sardari was the uncle of Amir Abbas and Fereydoun Hoveyda.

Career
Sardari became an Iranian diplomat in Paris in 1937.  As the Holocaust struck, which eventually led to the crippling of the embassy. While many of Sardari's colleagues in the embassy fled to Vichy, France (a safer city at the time), he decided to remain in Paris. The Nazi-Germany invasion of France also led to the departure of Iran's ambassador in Paris, who was Sardari's brother in law, which is precisely what led to affairs of the embassy being left to Abdol Hossein Sardari.

Sardari was in charge of the Iranian consular office in Paris in 1942. There was a sizeable community of Iranian Jews in Paris when German forces invaded and occupied the city.

Leaning on the national socialist perception that Iranians were Aryan, Nazi Germany had also declared Iranians to be immune to all Nuremberg Laws since 1936, as they were "pure-blooded Aryans" according to their racial theory. The Iranian government of the time during Reza Shah was able to protect Iranian Jews, whose families had been present in Iran since the time of the Persian Empire. (Cyrus the Great personally ordered the Jews of Babylonia to be freed from Babylonian slavery.) He very strongly argued this point to the Germans and specifically ascertained that the Iranian Jews were protected under these statutes. The Nazis grudgingly agreed, and accordingly, many Persian Jews were saved from harassment and eventually deportation by the Nazi regime.

Once he realized the full nature of Nazi ambitions, Sardari began issuing hundreds of Iranian passports for non-Iranian Jews to save them from persecution. To safeguard his plan, he did not ask for permission, and felt that support by the Iranian leadership was implied. His actions were later confirmed and applauded by the government of Iran.

Iranian Jews in Paris 
After fleeing the Bolshevik Revolution of 1917, many Iranian Jews settled in Paris during the 1920s and 1930s. Many of them lived in luxurious houses, owned stores, and studied at universities. In May 1940, Nazi Germany invaded France and occupied the entire northern part of the country. This caused a great deal of fear. Just as they did in other countries, the Nazis readied to identify, imprison, and kill the Jews. The Jews in Paris feared for their lives, and many fled Paris even prior to the invasion. Those who remained were of course identified by the Nazis and had the yellow Star of David badges sewn onto their clothes. As Jews in France began to be rounded up, the growing fears were unimaginable. It was not at all easy for these Jews to leave France, because they required a valid passport. However, Sardari helped out roughly 1,000 Iranian Jewish families escape the Nazi-occupied country, not to mention the many non-Iranian Jews he freed. He did so by issuing Iranian passports and other necessary forms of documentation.

Operation to Rescue the Jews 
His first step to help Iranian Jews in France, was to issue them with new passports that did not state their religion. He helped around 2,000 Jews obtain passports. Ibrahim Morady, an Iranian Jewish merchant that was saved by Sardari years ago, recently remembered and stated that Sardari was asked by Iran's Foreign Ministry to return to Iran. According to Morady, “he was called by the government to return to Persia.” Sardari refused to leave the Jews behind and feared that they would be deported with the rest. Sardari had a good notion of what the Nazis were capable of. Once again, he refused to leave Paris and continued aiding thousands of Jews. He began issuing hundreds of Iranian passports for non-Iranian Jews as well, to protect them from the hands of the Nazis. The Iranians who got their passports would beseech Sardari to issue passports for their non-Iranian friends, spouses, and colleagues. In hopes of protecting them from persecution, Sardari issued passports and signed affidavits for as many Iranian and non-Iranian Jews as he could.

Sardari was determined to free the Iranian Jews and get them out of France immediately. He did so by making use of his political position. He argued that the Iranian Jews do not belong to Hitler's “enemy race”. He testified that they are not Jewish; that they are in fact “Djougoutes”. He argued that they were not of Jewish descendancy and that in Iran, they have the same civil, legal, and military rights and responsibilities as Muslims. As it turned out, many senior Nazis in Berlin, saw things his way. Though he formulated this argument in hopes of sparing the Iranian Jews, he did just as much to help non-Iranian Jews escape the horrors of the war.

His efforts to help the Jews of France went as far as hiding their belongings for them. When the Germans attacked France, Sardari told a man who went by the name of Haim Sassoon, that he would hide the Jewish man's antiquities in the embassy or the basement of his own house during the war. When the Germans were no longer in France, Sardari called Mr. Sassoon and said to him “you could now come and collect your belongings.”.

Post-World War II
When World War II ended, Sardari worked in Brussels, Belgium for the Iranian Diplomatic Corps.

His later life was blighted by many misfortunes. His lover, Tchin Tchin (Chiao-Yen Chow), was a Chinese opera singer. She disappeared during the Chinese Civil War in 1948 when she travelled to China to receive a blessing from her parents to marry Sardari.

In 1952, he had to return to Tehran, Iran and was charged with misconduct for issuing the Iranian passports during the war. Consequently, his career was damaged until was able resolve his reputation in 1955. Shortly thereafter, he retired from the Iranian Diplomatic Corps and moved to London. The Iranian Revolution of 1979 brought Sardari a great deal of despair when he heard the news that his nephew had been murdered and that all of his belongings in Iran were destroyed.

He resided in Nottingham at the end of his life and died in London in 1981.

Honors 
Sardari has been honored by Jewish organizations such as the convention in Beverly Hills, and the Simon Wiesenthal Center on multiple occasions. In April 1978, three years before his death, Abdol Hossein Sardari responded to the queries of Yad Vashem, the Israeli national Holocaust Memorial, about his actions in this way: "As you may know, I had the pleasure of being the Iranian Consul in Paris during the German occupation of France, and as such it was my duty to save all Iranians, including Iranian Jews."

In popular culture
The 2007 Iranian TV series Zero Degree Turn (Madare sefr darajeh) was loosely based on Sardari's actions in Paris. The focus of the series is an Iranian Muslim who falls in love with a Jewish woman while studying in France during World War II and later desperately looks for ways to save her and other Jews from the imminent threat of deportation.

References

External links 
Abdol Hossein Sardari
Abdolhossein Sardari: An Iranian Hero of the Holocaust United States Holocaust Memorial Museum

1914 births
1981 deaths
Exiles of the Iranian Revolution in the United Kingdom
Iranian diplomats
Muslim Righteous Among the Nations
Iranian people of World War II
University of Geneva alumni
Iranian emigrants to the United Kingdom
20th-century Iranian people
People from Tehran
People who rescued Jews during the Holocaust